German submarine U-450 was a Type VIIC U-boat in the service of Nazi Germany during World War II.

Design

German Type VIIC submarines were preceded by the shorter Type VIIB submarines. U-450 had a displacement of  when at the surface and  while submerged. She had two shafts and two  propellers.

U-450 was fitted with five  torpedo tubes (four fitted at the bow and one at the stern), fourteen torpedoes, one  SK C/35 naval gun, 220 rounds, and a  C/30 anti-aircraft gun. The boat had a complement of between forty-four and sixty.

Service history

The submarine was laid down on 22 July 1941 in Danzig, Germany (now Poland). She was launched on 4 July 1942 and commissioned on 12 September that year. During her career with the Kriegsmarine, U-450 never sank any ships.

Patrols
On 27 May 1943, three days after she was redesignated from a training vessel to a front-line service boat, U-450 set out for her first patrol from Kiel, the home base of the 9th U-boat Flotilla under the command of Oberleutnant zur See Kurt Böhme. As the boat surfaced off the coast of Iceland on 6 June, she came under attack from a British B-17 Flying Fortress squadron, which wounded seven men. 16 days later, (with assistance from other boats due to the damage caused by the attack), she arrived at Brest in France. The patrol lasted 27 days, the longest of her career.

On 17 October 1943, U-450 left Brest for Toulon. She arrived at the port city 23 days later.

On 10 February 1944, ten days after a fire in her engine room had swept one man overboard and forced her to return to base, U-450 left Toulon for the Italian coast, presumably to attack support ships coming to reinforce Allied troops which had just landed at Anzio.

Fate
The submarine sank, at position , but all 51 crew members were rescued by the destroyers and became prisoners of war.

See also
 Mediterranean U-boat Campaign (World War II)

References

Bibliography

External links

U-boats commissioned in 1942
World War II submarines of Germany
1941 ships
Ships built in Danzig
U-boats sunk in 1944
U-boats sunk by depth charges
U-boats sunk by British warships
U-boats sunk by US warships
World War II shipwrecks in the Mediterranean Sea
Ships built by Schichau
German Type VIIC submarines
Ships sunk with no fatalities
Maritime incidents in March 1944